The following is an incomplete list of paintings by Jacob van Ruisdael that are generally accepted as autograph by Seymour Slive and other sources. The list is more or less in order of creation, starting from around 1645 when Jacob began painting on his own. Prior to that, he was assistant to his father Isaack van Ruisdael and his uncle Salomon van Ruysdael.

Sources

 Jacob van Ruisdael, Exhibition catalog Mauritshuis and Fogg Art Museum, by Seymour Slive, Hendrik Richard Hoetink, Mark Greenberg, Meulenhoff/Landshoff, 1981
 Jacob van Ruisdael, catalog raisonné by E. John Walford, Yale University Press, 1991
Jacob van Ruisdael: A Complete Catalogue of His Paintings, Drawings, and Etchings, a catalog raisonné with +/- 700 paintings, 130+ drawings, and 13 etchings by Seymour Slive, Yale University Press, New Haven, CT, 2001Jacob van Ruisdael: Master of Landscape, Exhibition catalog Los Angeles County Museum of Art, Philadelphia Museum of Art, and Royal Academy of Arts, London, by Seymour Slive, 2005-2006
 Jacob van Ruisdael in the RKD

 List
Ruisdael, Jacob van